Benjamin Ayim (born 19 February 2000) is a Ghanaian footballer who currently plays as a attacking midfielder for Khor Fakkan.

Career statistics

Club

Notes

References

External links
 

2000 births
Living people
Ghanaian footballers
Ghanaian expatriate footballers
Association football midfielders
UAE Pro League players
Dreams F.C. (Ghana) players
Al Falah FC players
Al Dhafra FC players
Khor Fakkan Sports Club players
Expatriate footballers in the United Arab Emirates
Ghanaian expatriate sportspeople in the United Arab Emirates